Long Road Sixth Form College (LRSFC) is a public sector co-educational sixth form college in Cambridge, England. It is situated on Long Road, from which it draws its name, and is located next to the Cambridge Bio-Medical Campus which encompasses Addenbrooke's Hospital. The College provides full-time A level courses in addition to Level 3 Diploma courses, Level 2 Diploma courses and GCSE consolidation courses.

History
Established in 1974, the College occupies a  site. Prior to this it was the Cambridgeshire High School for Girls, a girls' grammar school. A significant proportion of the College's current buildings date from this period, although there has been extensive renovation and the construction of three entirely new buildings, as well as a new sports centre that opened in 2005 (the College's first new sports building since 1939). Other renovation projects included the expansion of the Learning Resource Centre (in 2010), performing arts studios (in June 2012) and the student centre (in November 2012). Science laboratories were updated in August 2013 and new teaching spaces for media diploma and business diploma courses were opened in August 2013. Additional classroom space was provided for sociology and for the Level 4 Foundation in art and design course (2015). There are extended classrooms for the Criminology Diploma (2016).

Academia 
The College has approximately 2,300 full-time students, who are between the ages of 16 and 19. Most of these students study A level courses, with others taking Level 3 Diploma courses, one-year GCSE courses or Level 2 Diploma courses.  Around 75% of students go on to higher education each year.  The College is in the top 25% in England for helping students achieve better grades than were predicted when they joined the College.

Sports
The College has sport facilities including playing fields (a football pitch, a rugby pitch), floodlit all-weather hockey pitch, two outdoor basketball courts, two tennis courts, and an indoor sports centre which includes a  gymnasium and an indoor basketball court.

External clubs also use the College's facilities as their home venue, such as Cambridge South Hockey Club on the Hockey pitch and Cambridge Cats Basketball Club in the gymnasium.

Notable staff members
 Dan Gresham, a drum and bass producer who was a teacher of music technology

Notable alumni

Cambridgeshire High School for Girls
P. D. James, crime writer
Jean Purdy, nurse and embryologist
Margaret Spufford, historian
Frances Stewart, development economist

Long Road Sixth Form College

Heather Craney, actor who has appeared in Vera Drake, Life of Riley and Torchwood
Everton Fox, weather presenter who previously presented for BBC Weather
Emerald O'Hanrahan, actor who plays Emma Carter in The Archers
Nick Mulvey, musician, twice nominated for the Mercury Music Prize
Thomas Ridgwell, known for his internet videos under the name TomSka
Rowan Robertson, musician, recruited to play guitar for Dio at age 17

References

Schools in Cambridge
Educational institutions established in 1974
Sixth form colleges in Cambridgeshire
1974 establishments in England